Sahlberg is a Swedish surname.

Asko Sahlberg
Carl Reinhold Sahlberg, a Finnish entomologist
Johan Reinhold Sahlberg, a Finnish entomologist
Magnus Sahlberg
Pär Axel Sahlberg (born 1954), Swedish politician
Pasi Sahlberg
Reinhold Ferdinand Sahlberg, a Finnish entomologist 

Finland Swedish surnames
Swedish-language surnames